A Cork County Council election was held in Ireland on 23 May 2014 as part of that year's local elections. Fifty-five councillors were elected from a field of 114 candidates for a five-year term of office from eight local electoral areas by proportional representation with a single transferable vote.

Cork County Council was expanded by seven seats to a total of 55 members for the 2014 elections. Fianna Fáil emerged after the local elections as the largest party in Cork for the first time since 1991, having won 17 seats and 5 gains in total. The party won three seats in each of Ballincollig-Carrigaline, Fermoy and West Cork and took two seats in Bandon-Kinsale, Blarney-Macroom and Kanturk-Mallow. Fine Gael lost 6 seats in all to emerge with 16 seats. The party's best results were in Ballincollig-Carrigaline and Bandon-Kinsale where they won 3 seats and Blarney-Macroom, Cobh, East Cork and West Cork where they won 2 seats. Sinn Féin won 10 seats in total, including 9 gains, with the party's best results coming in Ballincollig-Carrigaline and Cobh where they won 2 seats each. Labour had a very bad election losing 5 seats and returning with just 2 seats. Independents gained 4 seats, bringing their total to 10 seats.

Results by party

Results by Electoral Area

Ballincollig-Carrigaline

Bandon-Kinsale

Blarney-Macroom

Cobh

East Cork

Fermoy

Kanturk-Mallow

West Cork

Changes since 2014
 On 22 June 2015 Cobh Sinn Féin Cllr Kieran McCarthy was expelled from the party and became an Independent.
 Bandon-Kinsale Fianna Fáil Cllr Alan Coleman resigned from the party and became an Independent on 25 June 2015 having declined to contest the Cork South West selection convention for the 2016 Irish general election. He subsequently announced he would be contesting the election as an Independent. 
 On 25 September 2015 Fermoy Sinn Féin Cllr June Murphy resigned from the party citing her time in the party as an increasingly negative experience and became an Independent. She joined the Social Democrats on 20 February 2018.
 On 8 October 2015 Fermoy Labour Cllr Noel McCarthy resigned from the party citing disillusionment with the party hierarchy.  On 28 November 2015 he was selected as a Fine Gael candidate for the 2016 Irish general election in the Cork East constituency..
 On 13 November 2015 Ger Keohane resigned from Sinn Féin and became an Independent. On 21 November 2018 he joined Peadar Tóibín's organisation.
 Kanturk-Mallow Fianna Fáil Councillor Dan Joe Fitzgerald died on 8 March 2016.  His son, Daniel, was co-opted to fill the vacancy on 13 June 2016. Following his resignation there was a delayed convention to fill the vacancy. This ultimately saw Gearoid Murphy co-opted on 10 April 2017.
 Ballincollig-Carrigaline Sinn Féin Cllr Donnchadh O Laoghaire was elected as a TD for Cork South-Central at the Irish general election, 2016. Eoghan Jeffers was co-opted to fill the vacancy on 14 March 2016. 
 Bandon-Kinsale Fianna Fáil Cllr Margaret Murphy-O'Mahony was elected as a TD for Cork South-West at the Irish general election, 2016. Gillian Coughlan was co-opted to fill the vacancy on 14 March 2016.
 Blarney-Macroom Fianna Fáil Cllr Aindrias Moynihan was elected as a TD for Cork North-West at the Irish general election, 2016. His sister, Gobnait, was co-opted to fill the vacancy on 14 March 2016.
 East Cork Sinn Féin Cllr Pat Buckley was elected as a TD for Cork East at the Irish general election, 2016. Danielle Twomey was co-opted to fill the vacancy on 14 March 2016. 
 Fermoy Fianna Fáil Cllr Kevin O'Keeffe was elected as a TD for Cork East at the Irish general election, 2016. His sister, Deirdre O'Brien, was co-opted to fill the vacancy on 14 March 2016.
 West Cork Independent Cllr Michael Collins was elected as a TD for Cork South-West at the Irish general election, 2016. His brother, Danny, was co-opted to fill the vacancy on 14 March 2016.
 Fine Gael Cllr Tim Lombard was elected to Seanad Éireann in April 2016. His brother, Aidan, was co-opted to fill the vacancy on 13 June 2016.
 Independent Cobh Cllr Claire Cullinane died suddenly on 14 December 2016. Diarmuid O Cadhla was co-opted to fill the vacancy.
 Ballincollig-Carrigaline Independent Cllr Joe Harris joined the Social Democrats on 28 February 2017.
 East Cork Fianna Fáil Cllr Aaron O'Sullivan resigned his seat on 24 November 2017 citing work pressures. Michael Ahern was co-opted to fill the vacancy on 23 April 2018.
 West Cork Fine Gael Cllr Noel O'Donovan resigned his seat in 2018 upon being appointed as a Garda. On 31 March 2017 John O'Sullivan was co-opted to fill the vacancy.
 Kanturk-Mallow Independent Cllr John Paul O'Shea joined Fine Gael and ceased to be an Independent on 2 March 2018.

References

External links 
 

2014 Irish local elections
2014